The following lists events that happened in 1936 in El Salvador.

Incumbents
President: Maximiliano Hernández Martínez 
Vice President: Vacant

Events

January
 January – The 1936 Salvadoran legislative election was held but no election results were posted.

May
 May 2 – El Diario de Hoy newspaper began publication.

References

 
El Salvador
1930s in El Salvador
Years of the 20th century in El Salvador
El Salvador